Spanish Affair 2 is a 2015 Spanish comedy film directed by Emilio Martínez-Lázaro. It is the sequel to the 2014 box-office hit Spanish Affair, with the four main actors reprising their characters.

Plot
Some time after the events of Ocho apellidos vascos, Rafa and Amaia have parted ways and now she is dating a Catalan man named Pau. After having given in to the idea of his daughter dating an Andalusian, Koldo decides this is too much and ventures outside the borders of the Basque Country for the first time in his life to search for Rafa in Seville and to convince him to try and win back Amaia's heart.

Cast

Release
Distributed by Universal Pictures, the film premiered in Spain on 20 November 2015. The weekend of its premiere, the film gathered an audience of 1,117,678 which resulted in box office grossing of 7.9 million euros. Worldwide, the movie has accrued $40.6 million.

See also 
 List of Spanish films of 2015

References

External links 
 

Spanish comedy films
2015 comedy films
Spanish sequel films
Films scored by Roque Baños
2010s Spanish-language films
2010s Spanish films
Films set in Spain